Built in 1926, the Casa Caprona (also known as the Markert Apartments) is a historic building in Fort Pierce, Florida, USA. It is located at 2605 St. Lucie Boulevard. The complex was designed in the Mediterranean Revival style by architects Arthur Beck and J.K. Shinn, and was built by T.H. Markenthaler and T.H. Kertshner. For a period of time the complex housed people training in the Navy's underwater demolition group during WWII. The complex was envisioned as the centerpiece for the proposed winter community of San Lucie Plaza. However, due to the collapse of the Florida land boom, the project failed.

After a collaborative effort from the Casa Carpona condominium association  the property was named a landmark in 1984. On June 2, 1984, it was added to the U.S. National Register of Historic Places.

Gallery

References

External links
 St. Lucie County listings at National Register of Historic Places
 St. Lucie County listings at Florida's Office of Cultural and Historical Programs

Fort Pierce, Florida
Apartment buildings in Florida
Buildings and structures in St. Lucie County, Florida
Residential buildings completed in 1926
National Register of Historic Places in St. Lucie County, Florida
Residential buildings on the National Register of Historic Places in Florida
Mediterranean Revival architecture in Florida
1926 establishments in Florida